Red dog  or Red Dog may refer to:

Animals
 Dhole, a canid species also called the red dog or Asiatic wild dog
 Red Dog (Pilbara), a dog who traveled Western Australia in the 1970s that became the basis for the novel "Red Dog" and the related film franchise.

Bars
 Red Dog Saloon, a bar in Juneau, Alaska
 Red Dog Saloon (Virginia City, Nevada), a bar that played an important role in the history of the psychedelic music scene

Entertainment and media

Characters
 Red Dog (G.I. Joe), a fictional character in the G.I. Joe universe
 Red Dog, a canine character in the Red Dog film series played by the Australian canine film actor Koko and that is based on the Pilbara wanderer.

Films
 Red Dog (film), a 2011 film adapted from de Bernières' novel
 Red Dog: True Blue, a prequel to the 2011 film
 Koko: A Red Dog Story, a spin-off documentary about the star of the 2011 film, Koko

Games
 Red dog (card game), a card game found in some casinos
 Red Dog: Superior Firepower, a Dreamcast Vehicular combat game style shooter

Literature
 Red Dog (novel), a short novel by Louis de Bernières
 "Red Dog" (Kipling short story), a Mowgli story by Rudyard Kipling
 Red Dog (short story collection), a short story (and collection of anecdotes and poetry) by Nancy Gillespie

Music
 The Legendary Red Dog, nickname of Joseph L. Campbell, roadie for The Allman Brothers Band

Mining
 Red Dog, California, a mining ghost town
 Red Dog mine, Alaska
 Red dog (coal slag), a byproduct of coal mining

Sports
 Red dog (American football), a strategy of sending a player on a full-out defensive rush, known in the modern era as a blitz.
 Red Dogs, the name given to fans of the Romanian football team FC Dinamo București
 Redd Dogg, a ring name used by professional wrestler Rodney Begnaud

Other uses
 Operation Red Dog, a planned invasion of Dominica, organized by American and Canadian Ku Klux Klan leaders in concert with former prime minister Patrick John
 Microsoft Azure, previously codenamed "Red Dog"
 Red Dog (beer), an inexpensive beer produced by the Plank Road Brewery (Miller Brewing Co.)